The  was a limited-stop reserved-seat "Home Liner" service for commuters on the Sobu Main Line and Chuo Main Line operated by East Japan Railway Company (JR East). The train operated in the weekday evenings only. All seats were reserved with a supplement of 510 yen. With the timetable revision starting on 16 March 2019, this service was discontinued.

Route
 Home Liner Chiba 1, 3, 7 and 9 (via Sobu Line (Rapid))
  -  -  -  - 
 Home Liner Chiba 5 (via Chuo-Sobu Line)
  -  - Funabashi - Tsudanuma - Inage - Chiba

Rolling stock

Former
 E257-500 series

See also
 Home Liner

References

East Japan Railway Company
Named passenger trains of Japan